India Poochega: Sabse Shaana Kaun? is an Indian reality game show hosted by actor Shah Rukh Khan. Adapted from the "Who's Asking?" international format, it opened on 2 March 2015 on Zee Network's newly launched entertainment channel &TV. The format of the show is simple. They will first be asked questions by ordinary people. Once they clear that round, a galaxy of celebrities will ask the winning pair a set of questions. There are the usual lifelines and so on.

Format 
The show is a first of its kind where the common man will don the hat of the 'asker', as well as that of the contestant. While the 'askers' shall pose the questions, the contestants will be seen demonstrating their street-smartness to win big bucks. In the first round, the contestants have to look at  options on the screen and pick a questioner for themselves. In the second round, the opposite team has to pick one for their competitors. The finalists will face a pyramid of 15 celebrity questioners.

Celebrity appearances

Reception
Subramanian Harikumar of Bollywood Life gave the show 3.5 out of 5 stars and said, "India Poochega: Sabse Shaana Kaun has everything that you expect from a Shah Rukh Khan show and the actor has put his best foot forward, turning on the charm to full swing, adding glitz and glamour to a rather simple yet entertaining show." Ankita Chaurasia of The Times of India also gave a positive review, citing that "The show is interactive and manages to engage the viewer; Shah Rukh Khan's jokes and impeccable timing spice things up and keep the audience engaged. It has managed to generate enough buzz to garner decent numbers in the first week. If you haven't watched the show as yet, here's an invitation to do so."

References 

Indian game shows
&TV original programming
2015 Indian television series debuts
2015 Indian television series endings